Đa Phước  is a rural commune (xã) and village in the An Phú District of An Giang Province, Vietnam.

References

Communes of An Giang province
Populated places in An Giang province